Belgrade and St. David's Church, also known as Pettigrew's Chapel, is a historic Episcopal church and home located at Creswell, Washington County, North Carolina. St. David's Church was built over a number of years.  It is a cruciform, weatherboarded frame structure with a cross gable roof.  It features a late-19th century two-part bell tower with a four-faced, pyramidal, bell-cast spire. Belgrade was built about 1797, and is a small one-story Georgian style frame dwelling with a steep gable roof. It was the home of the home of Charles "Parson" Pettigrew, first Bishop of the Episcopal Diocese of North Carolina.

It was listed on the National Register of Historic Places in 1978.

References

External links 
 

Historic American Buildings Survey in North Carolina
Episcopal church buildings in North Carolina
Churches on the National Register of Historic Places in North Carolina
Houses on the National Register of Historic Places in North Carolina
Georgian architecture in North Carolina
Churches completed in 1797
18th-century Episcopal church buildings
Churches in Washington County, North Carolina
National Register of Historic Places in Washington County, North Carolina
Houses in Washington County, North Carolina